Cape Coast is a city, fishing port, and the capital of Cape Coast Metropolitan District and Central Region of Ghana. It is one of the country's most historic cities, a World Heritage Site, home to the Cape Coast Castle, with the Gulf of Guinea situated to its south. According to the 2010 census, Cape Coast had a settlement population of 169,894 people. The language of the people of Cape Coast is Fante.

The older traditional names of the city are Oguaa and Kotokuraba (meaning "River of Crabs" or "Village of Crabs"). The Portuguese navigators João de Santarém and Pedro Escobar who sailed past Oguaa in 1471 designated the place Cabo Corso (meaning "short cape"), from which the name Cape Coast derives. From the 16th century to the country's independence in 1957, the city changed hands between the British, the Portuguese, the Swedish, the Danish and the Dutch. It is home to 32 festivals and celebrations.

History
Cape Coast was founded by the people of Oguaa and the region ruled over by the paramount chief, or Omanhene, is known today as Oguaa Traditional Area. Cape Coast is one of the most historical cities in Ghana. Portuguese colonists built a trading fort in the area. In 1650, the Swedes built a lodge that would later become the better known Cape Coast Castle, which is now a World Heritage Site. Most of the modern town expanded around it. The Dutch took it over in 1650 and expanded it in 1652. It was then captured by the British in 1664.

Trade was an important motivator in the creation of fortresses and settlements on Cape Coast. Traders from various European countries built these trading lodges, forts and castles along the coast of modern Ghana. Unfortunately, the acquisition of gold, slaves, honey, and the many other goods that composed the African leg of the Triangular Trade was increasingly detrimental to the inhabitants of Cape Coast.
In 1874, the British dominated all European presence along the coast of modern-day Ghana using Cape Coast as their base of operations, Gold Coast. With the establishment of formal colonial administration, they relocated to Accra following opposition to the "window tax" in 1877. Accra became their state. Cape Coast Castle was also where most of the slaves were held before their journey on the Middle Passage.

Asafo companies

Oguaa Traditional Area has seven asafo companies – traditional warrior groups, based on lineal descent, whose historical role was defence of the state (the word deriving from sa, meaning "war", and fo, meaning "people") – with a complex social and political organization based on martial principles, and elaborate traditions of visual art. The asafo companies feature largely in Cape Coast's annual Fetu Afahye festival held on the first Saturday of September, and each have historically established uniform colours: Esi Sutherland-Addy identifies these as: No. 1. Bentsir – red; No. 2. Anafo – blue and white; No. 3. Ntsin – green; No. 4. Nkum – yellow; No. 5. Amanful – wine and black; No. 6. Abrofomba (Brofo Nkoa) – white; No. 7. Ankrampa – white and black.

20th century 
The city's St. Francis Cathedral was dedicated in 1928. The building is the first Catholic Cathedral built in Ghana. In addition, one of the first Catholic schools in Ghana, St. Augustine College, was established in Cape Coast during 1936. The cocoa marketing boom of the 1900s that Ghana experienced, the city experienced a certain period of economic prosperity. After the completion of harbours and railways in other parts of the country such as Sekondi and Kumasi, cocoa cultivation and trade in Ghana diversified and Cape Coast lost some importance. However, after the establishment of the Roman Catholic Archdiocese and the university of the city in 1950 and 1962 respectively, Cape Coast became a regional educational hub for this area of Ghana.

Transportation

There are Public Transports from Cape Coast to major cities such as Accra; Kumasi, Mim, Ahafo ; Sunyani; Tamale; Tema; Ho; Wa; Bolgatanga; Elubo; Aflao, Techiman.

Geography

Topography
The area is dominated by batholith rock and is generally undulating with steep slopes. There are valleys of various streams between the hills, with Kakum being the largest stream.

The minor streams end in wetlands, the largest of which drains into the Fosu Lagoon at Bakano. In the northern part of the district, however, the landscape is suitable for the cultivation of various crops.

Climate
Cape Coast has a tropical savanna climate (Köppen: As) with two long wet seasons – a heavier one from March to July and a lighter one from September to November – alongside two short dry seasons in January/February and in August.

Cape Coast is a humid area with mean monthly relative humidity varying between 85% and 99%. The sea breeze has a moderating effect on the local climate.

Attractions
The crab is the city's mascot and a statue of one stands in the city centre. Fort William, built in 1820, was an active lighthouse from 1835 to the 1970s, while Fort Victoria was built in 1702.

The main market of Cape Coast is called Kotokuraba Market.

Other attractions include a series of Asafo shrines,  Cape Coast Centre for National Culture, the Oguaa Fetu Afahye festival (held on the first Saturday of September), and since 1992, the biennial Panafest theatre festival. The city is located 30 km south of Kakum National Park, one of the most diverse and best preserved national parks in West Africa.

It is believed that Michelle Obama, US First Lady, considers Cape Coast as her ancestral home, and on 11 July 2009, she took the rest of the first family to tour Cape Coast Castle as part of her husband's trip to Cape Coast.

Education

Cape Coast is the seat of the University of Cape Coast (UCC), Ghana's leading university in teaching and research. Cape Vars, as it is popularly called, lies on a hill overlooking the Atlantic Ocean. It also has one of the best Polytechnics, the Cape Coast Polytechnic (C-POLY). The city also boasts some of Ghana's finest secondary and technical schools:
 Wesley Girls' High School
 St. Augustine College
Holy Child High School, Ghana
 Mfantsipim School
 Adisadel College
 Aggrey Memorial Senior High School
 Ghana National College
 Edinaman Senior High School
 Cape Coast Technical Institute
 Asuansi Technical Institute
 Academy of Christ the King Senior High School
 Cape Coast International Senior High School
 University Practice Senior High School
 St. Nicholas Seminary Senior High School
 Efutu Senior High Technical School
 Sammo Senior High School
 Commercial Service Institute (CSI) 
 Oguaa Senior High Technical School

Notable people 
Notable people born in or associated with Cape Coast include:
 John Atta Mills: 1944-2012 former President of Ghana
 Frederick Acheampong: (born 1978); member of Ghana Football Association's Executive Council.
 Kwesi Bekoe Amissah-Arthur:1951– 2018; former vice-president of the Republic of Ghana.
 Samuel Richard Brew Attoh-Ahuma: 1863–1921; clergyman, nationalist, pioneering Pan-Africanist.
 Kofi Bentsi-Enchill: 1895–1948; textiles tycoon, philanthropist.
 Prince James Hutton Brew: 1844–1915; solicitor.
 Kwesi Brew: 1928–2007; poet and diplomat.
 Joseph Peter Brown: 1843–1932; patriot, statesman.
 Margaret Busby, OBE, also titled Nana Akua Ackon I: 1944–; publisher, editor, writer and broadcaster. Enstoolment in 1999.
 J. E. Casely Hayford: 1866–1930; author, lawyer, politician and educator.
 James Cheetham: 1834–1902; merchant, member of the Legislative Council of the Gold Coast.
 Ambrose Thompson Cooke: 1930–; millionaire, industrialist, textiles CEO and entrepreneur. Alumni London School of Economics and St Augustine's College Cape Coast
 Sir James Henley Coussey, KBE: 1895–1958; High Court judge, chairman of the Coussey Commission, president of the West Africa Court of Appeal.
 John Coleman de-Graft Johnson: 1884–1956; secretary of Native Affairs, anthropologist.
 Samuel George Duker: 1905–1994; LRCP Edin, LRCS Edin, LRFPS Glasg; pioneering physician
 King John Aggery Essien: 1809–1899; King of Cape Coast, pioneer Pan-Africanist.
Nana Amba Eyiaba I: 1950–; Queen mother of Effutu 16 of the Effutu Municipal District, educator and advocate for political rights of queen mothers
 Francis Chapman Grant: 1823–1889; founding member of the Fanti Confederation; cousin of Ulysses Grant.
 Charles Emmanuel Graves: 1884–1929; musicologist, composer.
 Mark Christian Hayford: 1863–1935; author, founder of Gold Coast Baptist Church and the Christian Army of the Gold Coast
 Robert Hutchison: 1828–1863; statesman, soldier, philanthropist.
 Prophet Jemisimiham Jehu-Appiah: 1892–1948; founder of Musama Disco Christo Church in Africa.
 Thomas Frederic Edward Jones: 1850–1927; petitioned Queen Victoria about Lands Bill.
 John Mensah-Sarbah: 1864–1910; barrister, author, published Fanti Customary Laws.
 Henry Mercer-Ricketts: 1895–1980; pioneering physician.
 George Edward Moore: 1879–1950; recipient of the Ashanti Medal, executive member of the Aborigines' Rights Protection Society.
 Hon. Ebo Barton Odro, First Deputy Speaker of the Sixth Parliament of the Fourth Republic
 Andrew William Parker: 1840–1912; conscientious nationalist, fought in the Ashanti expedition.
 Philip Quaque: 1741–1816; first ordained African clergy of the Church of England.
 John Sarbah: 1834–1892; educationist, merchant, industrialist.
 William Esuman Gwira Kobina Sekyi: 1892–1956; lawyer, politician, author.
 Jacob Wilson Sey, alias Kwaa Bonyi: 1832–1902; millionaire, philanthropist, founding member of the Aborigines' Rights Protection Society.
 Efua Sutherland: 1924–1996; writer, dramatist, educationalist and cultural activist
 James Robert Thompson: 1810–1886; pioneering educationist.
 Peter Turkson: 1948–; Cardinal-Archbishop of Cape Coast.
 Herbert Taylor Ussher: 1836–1880; early administrator
 Henry van Hien: 1858–1928; President of the Aboriginal Rights Protection Society.
 Hon. William Ward-Brew, OBE: 1878–1943; lawyer, VP of Aborigines' Rights Protection Society.
 Herbert Winful: 1952–; engineering professor.

Media house 

 Kastle FM
 Asaase Radio
 Cape FM

Foods
The Fante people of Ghana are notable for their way of cooking. They are known for eating rich cuisine, mostly with more fish, meat, or any form of protein than necessary. It is believed that this is because of the number of rivers and lakes situated in the town. The people are known for their expert fishing and fish preservation abilities. Some of the cuisines are fante fante, etew and pepper sauce or okro stew, fante kenkey, which can be eaten with soups, stews or shito.

Sister cities
List of sister cities of Cape Coast, designated by Sister Cities International:

See also
 Cape Coast Castle

References

Bibliography
 Charles Tetty, "Medical Practitioners of African Descent in Colonial Ghana", International Journal of African Historical Studies, Vol. 18, No. 1 (1985), pp. 139–44, Boston University African Studies Center.
 Gallery of Gold Coast Celebrities 1632–1958, Vol 1 2 & 3; I.S. Ephson, Ghana Publishing Corporation, 1970.
 Kofi Baku, "Kobina Sekyi of Ghana: An Annotated Bibliography of His Writings", International Journal of African Historical Studies, Vol. 24, No. 2 (1991), pp. 369–81, Boston University African Studies Center.

External links

 
 Ghana-pedia webpage – Cape Coast

 
Populated places in the Central Region (Ghana)
Regional capitals in Ghana
Former Swedish colonies
Former colonies in Africa
Swedish colonisation in Africa
1482 establishments
15th-century establishments in Africa